Jill Furmanovsky (born 1953) is a British photographer who has specialised in documenting rock musicians.

Life and work
Born in Southern Rhodesia, Furmanovsky emigrated with her parents and brother Michael to London in 1965. She studied textile and graphic design at Central Saint Martins College of Art and Design from 1972 to 1974. In 1972, she became the official photographer at  the Rainbow Theatre, a significant venue for rock performances in the 1970s.

Furmanovsky has photographed many major rock musicians, including Bob Dylan, Led Zeppelin, Pink Floyd, Mike Oldfield, The Ramones, Bob Marley, Amy Winehouse, Eric Clapton, Blondie, The Police, The Clash, The Undertones, The Sex Pistols, The Pretenders and Oasis. Her book: The Moment – 25 Years of Rock Photography was published in 1995. An exhibition of Oasis photographs: Was There Then toured the UK and Ireland in 1997. The exhibition was followed by publication of the book: Was There Then – A Photographic Journey with Oasis.

Furmanovsky has received several awards for her music photography—including 'The Jane Bown Observer Portrait Award' for her portrait of Charlie Watts in 1992. Following in the lead of the photographic co-operative Magnum Photos. Furmanovsky established a website—rockarchive.com in 1998. Its aim was to make her work and those of her photographic colleagues more accessible to fans and collectors. To launch the project she selected 30 classic black and white images of major rock artists from her 30-year archive to  make into an edition of 30 darkroom prints.

Books
The Moment: 25 Years of Rock Photography, 1995, London, Paper Tiger, 
Was There Then Oasis. A Photographic Journey, 1997, London, Ebury Press,

Footnotes

External links
Jill Furmanovsky at the National Portrait Gallery
Rockarchive

1953 births
Living people
Photographers from London
British women photographers
Alumni of Central Saint Martins
Rhodesian emigrants to the United Kingdom